Çiğdemli can refer to:

 Çiğdemli, Aziziye
 Çiğdemli, Bala
 Çiğdemli, Çameli
 Çiğdemli, Kemah
 Çiğdemli, Silvan